The 30th Infantry Division was a unit of the Army National Guard in World War I and World War II. It was nicknamed the "Old Hickory" division, in honor of President Andrew Jackson. The Germans nicknamed this division "Roosevelt's SS". The 30th Infantry Division was regarded by a team of historians led by S.L.A. Marshall as the number one American infantry division in the European Theater of Operations (ETO), involved in 282 days of intense combat over a period from June 1944 through April 1945. In the present day the 30th Armored Brigade Combat Team is now a part of the North Carolina National Guard and their most recent combat deployment was in 2019.

World War I 

The division was originally activated as the 9th Division (drawing units from North Carolina, South Carolina, Virginia and Tennessee) under a 1917 force plan, but changed designation to the 30th Division after the American entry into World War I in April 1917. It was formally activated under its new title in October 1917, as an Army National Guard division from North Carolina, South Carolina, Georgia, and Tennessee.

In May 1918 the division was sent to Europe and arrived in England, where it departed for the Western Front soon after. The division, along with the 27th Division, was assigned to the U.S. II Corps but did not serve with the main American Expeditionary Force (AEF) and was instead attached to the Second Army of the British Expeditionary Force (BEF), trading American equipment for British equipment.

The major operations the 30th Division took part in were the Ypres-Lys, and the Somme offensive, in which it was one of the two American divisions that assisted the Australian Corps to break the Hindenburg Line in the Battle of St. Quentin Canal. The division had, in three months, from July until October 1918, sustained 1,237 officers and men killed in action (KIA), with a further 7,178 wounded in action (WIA) or missing in action (MIA).

Interwar period

World War II

Early years 
Following the entrance into the Second World War in December 1941, the division was called into federal service on 16 September 1940; it was a National Guard formation from the states of Georgia, North Carolina, South Carolina, and Tennessee. It was initially assigned to Fort Jackson, South Carolina, on 16 September, where it was located until October 1942. The 30th was moved to Camp Blanding, Florida, from the period October 1942 to May 1943, then to Camp Forrest, Tennessee, between May 1943 to 9 November 1943, and finally Camp Atterbury, Indiana, from 10 November 1943 to 26 January 1944.
Overseas: 11 February 1944

Combat chronicle 
After training in the United States for just over two years, the 30th Infantry Division, under the command of Major General Leland Hobbs, arrived in England, 22 February 1944, and trained for the Allied invasion of Normandy until June.

It landed at Omaha Beach, Normandy, on 11 June 1944, five days after the initial D-Day landings of 6 June 1944, secured the Vire-et-Taute Canal, crossed the Vire River on 7 July. Beginning on 25 July, the 30th Division spearheaded the Saint-Lô break-through of Operation Cobra, which was intended to break out of the Normandy beachhead, thus ending the stalemate that had occurred.

During the operation, on both 24 and 25 July, the 30th Division encountered a devastating friendly fire incident. As part of the effort to break out of the Normandy hedgerows, US Army Air Forces (USAAF) bombers from England were sent to carpet bomb a one-by-three-mile corridor of the German defenses opposite the American line. However, USAAF planners, in complete disregard or lack of understanding of their role in supporting the ground attack, loaded the heavy B-24 Liberator and B-17 Flying Fortress bombers with 500-pound bombs, destroying roads and bridges and complicating movement through the corridor, instead of lighter 100-pound bombs intended as antipersonnel devices against German defenders. Air planners switched the approach of attack by 90 degrees without informing ground commanders, thus a landmark road to guide the bombers to the bombing zone was miscommunicated as the point to begin the bombing run. Start point confusion was further compounded by red smoke signals that suddenly blew in the wrong direction, and bombs began falling on the heads of the American soldiers. There were over 100 friendly fire casualties over the two days, including Lieutenant General Lesley J. McNair, commander of Army Ground Forces under Malisau.

The division relieved the veteran 1st Infantry Division near Mortain on 6 August. The German drive to Avranches began shortly after. The 30th Division clashed with the elite 1st SS Panzer Division, and fierce fighting in place with all available personnel broke out. The division frustrated enemy plans and broke the spearhead of the enemy assault in a violent struggle from 7–12 August. After the liberation of Paris, the division drove east through Belgium, crossing the Meuse River at Visé and Liège on 10 September. Elements of the division entered the Netherlands on 12 September, and Maastricht fell the next day. Moving into Germany and taking up positions along the Wurm River, the 30th Division launched its attack on the heavily defended city of Aachen on 2 October 1944, and succeeded in contacting the 1st Division on 16 October, resulting in the encirclement and takeover of Aachen.

After a rest period, the 30th Division eliminated an enemy salient northeast of Aachen on 16 November, pushed through Alsdorf to the Inde River on 28 November, and then moved to rest areas. On 17 December the division rushed south to the Malmedy-Stavelot area to help block the powerful enemy drive in the Battle of the Bulge—the Germans's last attempt to win a decisive victory over the Western Allies. Again the division met the 1st SS Division, and again broke the spearhead of their assault. The 30th Division launched a counterattack on 13 January 1945 and reached a point 2 miles south of St. Vith, Belgium on 26 January, before leaving the battle and moving to an assembly area near Lierneux on 27 January, and to another near Aachen to prepare for attack deeper into the western edge of Germany at the Roer River. The Roer was crossed on 23 February 1945, near Jülich.

The 30th moved back for training and rehabilitation on 3 March, and on 24 March made its assault crossing of the Rhine. It pursued the enemy across Germany, mopping up enemy pockets of resistance, took Hamelin on 7 April, Braunschweig on 12 April, and helped to reduce Magdeburg on 17 April. As the 30th was capturing Braunschweig, elements of the Division also liberated Weferlingen, a sub-camp of Buchenwald.  Approximately 2,500 prisoners were freed through the efforts of the 30th.  The Russians were contacted at Grunewald on the Elbe River. The end of World War II in Europe came soon afterwards and, after a short occupation period, the 30th Division began its return to the United States, arriving on 19 August 1945. The surrender of Japan followed soon, which brought the war to an end, and the division was subsequently deactivated on 25 November 1945. By its disbandment, It had spent a cumulative 282 days in combat and had participated in the campaigns and battles of Normandy, Northern France, Rhineland, Ardennes-Alsace and Central Europe.

Casualties 
Total battle casualties: 18,446
Killed in action: 3,003
Wounded in action: 13,376
Missing in action: 903
Prisoner of war: 1,164

Assignments in ETO 
18 February 1944: XIX Corps, First Army.
15 July 1944: VII Corps
28 July 1944: XIX Corps
1 August 1944: XIX Corps, First Army, 12th Army Group
4 August 1944: V Corps
5 August 1944: VII Corps
13 August 1944: XIX Corps
26 August 1944: XV Corps, Third Army, 12th Army Group, but attached to First Army
29 August 1944: XIX Corps, First Army, 12th Army Group
22 October 1944: Ninth Army, 12th Army Group
17 December 1944: Ninth Army, 12th Army Group, but attached to V Corps, First Army, 12th Army Group
22 December 1944: XVIII Airborne Corps, and attached, with the First Army, to the British 21st Army Group
18 January 1945: XVIII Airborne Corps, First Army, 12th Army Group
3 February 1945: XIX Corps, Ninth Army, 12th Army Group
6 March 1945: XVI Corps
30 March 1945: XIX Corps
8 May 1945: XIII Corps

Postwar 
Following the war, the 30th Division was once again reactivated as a National Guard formation in 1947, split between three states. It included the 119th, 120th, and 121st Infantry Regiments.

In 1954, the division became an entirely North Carolina Army National Guard manned formation, as Tennessee's portion became the 30th Armored Division, which was maintained with the Alabama Army National Guard. In 1968 the division was designated as the 30th Infantry Division (Mechanized). On 4 January 1974 the division was again inactivated, and the brigade in North Carolina become the 30th Infantry Brigade (Mechanized) (Separate). The 2nd Brigade, 30th Infantry Division, became the 218th Infantry Brigade (Mechanized) (Separate).

Order of Battle

World War I 
 Headquarters, 30th Division
 59th Infantry Brigade
 117th Infantry Regiment (3rd Tennessee Infantry)
 118th Infantry Regiment (1st South Carolina Infantry, detachments from 2nd and 3rd Battalions, 1st North Carolina Infantry, and 3rd Battalion, 2nd South Carolina Infantry)
 114th Machine Gun Battalion (Troops A, B, and C, 1st Squadron Tennessee Cavalry)
 60th Infantry Brigade
 119th Infantry Regiment (2nd North Carolina Infantry, 1st Battalion, Headquarters Company (less band), Supply Company, and detachments from 2nd and 3rd Battalions, 2nd Tennessee Infantry, and detachments from 1st North Carolina Infantry)
 120th Infantry Regiment (3rd North Carolina Infantry, detachments from 2nd and 3rd Battalions, 2nd Tennessee Infantry and 1st North Carolina Infantry, and band, 2nd Tennessee Infantry)
 115th Machine Gun Battalion (Machine Gun Troop, North Carolina Cavalry, Troops B and C, 1st Squadron, North Carolina Cavalry, and detachment from 2nd Battalion, 1st North Carolina Infantry)
 55th Field Artillery Brigade
 113th Field Artillery Regiment (1st North Carolina Field Artillery and detachments from 1st North Carolina Infantry)
 114th Field Artillery Regiment (1st Tennessee Field Artillery and detachment from 2nd Battalion, 1st North Carolina Infantry)
 115th Field Artillery Regiment (1st Tennessee Infantry, less Machine Gun Company, detachment from 2nd Battalion, 2nd Tennessee Infantry, and detachment from 3rd Battalion, 1st North Carolina Infantry)
 105th Trench Mortar Battery (Troop D, Tennessee Cavalry)
 113th Machine Gun Battalion (Machine Gun Company, 1st Tennessee Infantry, as Company A; Machine Gun Company, 2nd Tennessee Infantry, as Company B; Machine Gun Company, 1st North Carolina Infantry, as Company C; Machine Gun Company, 2d South Carolina Infantry as, Company D; detachments of 2nd Battalion. 2nd Tennessee Infantry and 2nd Battalion, 1st North Carolina Infantry)
 105th Engineer Regiment (Companies A, B, and C, North Carolina Engineers, and Sanitary Detachment, Supply Company, Band, and Companies B, C, and D, 1st North Carolina Infantry)
 105th Field Signal Battalion (Company A, North Carolina Signal Corps as nucleus)
 Headquarters Troop, 30th Division (Troop A, South Carolina Cavalry)
 105th Train Headquarters and Military Police (Sanitary Detachment and Headquarters Company (loss band), 2nd South Carolina Infantry, and Troops A and D, 1st Squadron, North Carolina Cavalry)
 105th Ammunition Train (1st and 2d Battalions, 2nd South Carolina Infantry, and detachments from 2nd and 3rd Battalions, 1st North Carolina Infantry)
 105th Supply Train (North Carolina Supply Train, Supply Company, 2nd South Carolina Infantry, and individual transfers)
 105th Engineer Train (Company A, 1st North Carolina Infantry)
 105th Sanitary Train (1st North Carolina Ambulance Company, 1st North Carolina Field Hospital, 1st Tennessee Field Hospital, 1st South Carolina Field Hospital, and individual transfers)
 117th, 118th, 119th, and 120th Ambulance Companies and Field Hospitals

World War II

1939 
Headquarters, 30th Division (Macon, GA)
 Headquarters, Special Troops, 30th Division (Griffin, GA)
 Headquarters Company, 30th Division (Griffin, GA)
 30th Military Police Company (Springfield, GA)
 30th Signal Company (Canton, NC)
 105th Ordnance Company (Medium) (Nashville, TN)
 30th Tank Company (Light) (Forsyth, GA)
 59th Infantry Brigade (Columbia, SC)
 118th Infantry Regiment (Columbia, SC)
 121st Infantry Regiment (Macon, GA)
 60th Infantry Brigade (Graham, NC)
 117th Infantry Regiment (Knoxville, TN)
 120th Infantry Regiment (Raleigh, NC)
 55th Field Artillery Brigade (Savannah, GA)
 105th Ammunition Train (Georgia National Guard)
 113th Field Artillery Regiment (Raleigh, NC)
 115th Field Artillery Regiment (Memphis, TN)
 118th Field Artillery Regiment (Savannah, GA)
 105th Engineer Regiment (Raleigh, NC)
 105th Medical Regiment (Henderson, NC)
 105th Quartermaster Regiment (Charleston, SC)

Italics indicates state of headquarters allocation; headquarters not organized or inactive.

Combat 
Headquarters, 30th Infantry Division
 117th Infantry Regiment
 119th Infantry Regiment
 120th Infantry Regiment
 Headquarters and Headquarters Battery, DIVARTY
 113th Field Artillery Battalion (155 mm)
 118th Field Artillery Battalion (105 mm)
 197th Field Artillery Battalion (105 mm)
 230th Field Artillery Battalion (105 mm)
 105th Engineer Combat Battalion
 105th Medical Battalion
 30th Cavalry Reconnaissance Troop (Mechanized)
 Headquarters, Special Troops, 30th Infantry Division
 Headquarters Company, 30th Infantry Division
 730th Ordnance Light Maintenance Company
 30th Quartermaster Company
 30th Signal Company
 Military Police Platoon
 Band
 30th Counterintelligence Corps Detachment

See all attached units: 30thInfantry.org

Commanders

WWI 
Major General John Frank Morrison (28 August 1917)
 Brigadier General William S. Scott (19 September 1917)
 Major General Clarence P. Townsley (14 October 1917)
 Brigadier General Samson L. Faison (1 December 1917)
 Major General Clarence P. Townsley (6 December 1917)
 Brigadier General Samson L. Faison (17 December 1917)
 Brigadier General Lawrence D. Tyson (22 December 1917)
 Brigadier General George G. Gatley (28 December 1917)
 Brigadier General Samson L. Faison (1 January 1918)
 Brigadier General Lawrence D. Tyson (30 March 1918)
 Brigadier General Samson L. Faison (7 April 1918)
 Major General George W. Read (3 May 1918)
 Brigadier General Robert H. Noble (12 June 1918)
 Major General George W. Read (14 June 1918)
 Major General Samson L. Faison (15 June 1918)
 Major General Edward Mann Lewis (18 July 1918)
 Brigadier General Samson L. Faison (23 December 1918)

WWII 

 Maj. Gen. Henry D. Russell (September 1940 – April 1942),
 Maj. Gen. William H. Simpson (May–July 1942),
 Maj. Gen. Leland S. Hobbs (September 1942 – September 1945),
 Maj. Gen. Albert C. Smith (September 1945 to inactivation.)

Awards and distinctions 

Distinguished Unit Citations: 8
Awards: MH-6 ; DSC-50 ; DSM-1 ; SS-1,773 ; LM-12; DFC-3 ; SM-30 ; BSM-6,616 ; AM-154.
Foreign Awards: Belgian Fourragere-2 per Belgian decree #1393, dated 20 November 1945

Shoulder sleeve insignia 
Description:  The letters "O H" blue upon a red background, the "O" forming the elliptical outline of the device long axis to be  and short axis . The letter "H" within the "O". The letters "XXX" on the bar of the "H". The insignia to be worn with long axis vertical.

Symbolism:  The letters "O H" are the initials of "Old Hickory" and the "XXX" is the Roman notation for the number of the organization.

Background:  The shoulder sleeve insignia was originally approved on 23 October 1918 for the 30th Division. It was redesignated for the 30th Infantry Brigade on 20 February 1974. The insignia was redesignated effective 1 September 2004, with description updated, for the 30th Brigade Combat Team, North Carolina Army National Guard.

Notable members 
Kenneth W. Bilby, World War II
Charles L. Kelly, served in the Division in World War II, earned the Distinguished Service Cross as a Medical Evacuation Pilot in the Republic of Vietnam

Popular Culture 
Fury, from 2014 depicted an Easy-Eight Sherman tank of the 66th Armored Regiment of the 2nd Armored Division operating in support of grunts of the 30ID's 119th Infantry Regiment.

References

Notes

Bibliography 
 30th Infantry Division at Camp Atterbury, Indiana, includes re-constructed Roster
 
 
The Army Almanac: A Book of Facts Concerning the Army of the United States U.S. Government Printing Office, 1950 reproduced at CMH .

 Russell, Major General Henry D. The Purge of the Thirtieth Division. Naval Institute Press, 2014. .

 Mitchell A. Yockelson, Borrowed Soldiers: Americans under British Command, 1918, Norman, OK: University of Oklahoma Press, 2008, .

External links 

 Old Hickory Association – 120th Regt., 30th Infantry Division Living History Organization
 

United States Army divisions during World War II
Infantry divisions of the United States Army
Infantry divisions of the United States Army in World War II
United States Army divisions of World War I
Military units and formations established in 1917
Military units and formations disestablished in 1974